Henrik Albert Törnqvist (January 7, 1819 – August 25, 1898) was a Swedish architect.

Törnqvist was born in Stockholm and studied at the Royal Institute of Technology and Royal Swedish Academy of Fine Arts. He won the royal medal and received a traveling grant 1845–1851. During these years he visited France, Italy, Turkey, Anatolia, Egypt, and Nubia. In 1853, Törnqvist was selected to become a member of the Royal Swedish Academy of Fine Arts. He became vice professor in 1860.

Works

Civil buildings 

 Kondradsbergs hospital
 Rebuilding Kastenhof to Hotel Rydberg
 Rebuilding and extending Westmanska Palatset
 Ateljébyggnaden by Kungsträdgården
 Centralpostkontoret by Rödbodtorget (later rebuilt, demolished 1969-1970)
 Djurgårdsteatern
 Uppsala University Hospital, 1867

Churches

Sources 

1819 births
1898 deaths
People from Stockholm
19th-century Swedish architects